Homodigma is a monotypic snout moth genus described by George Hampson in 1930. Its single species, Homodigma geera, described in the same year, is found in Sri Lanka.

References

Phycitinae
Monotypic moth genera
Moths of Asia